Sassenheim is a railway station in Sassenheim, Netherlands and is situated on the Schiphollijn (Weesp - Leiden). Construction began in 2009 and the station was opened on 9 December 2011, while train services started on 11 December 2011. The station has 2 platforms.

Train service
, the following train services call at this station:
2x per hour local Sprinter service Leiden - Schiphol - Amsterdam - Zaandam - Hoorn
2x per hour local Sprinter service The Hague - Leiden - Schiphol - Amsterdam - Almere - Lelystad - Zwolle

Bus services
 Arriva 50 Leiden - Sassenheim - Lisse - Hillegom - Haarlem
 Connexxion 164 Sassenheim - Abbenes - Nieuw-Vennep - Hoofddorp
 Arriva Qliner 361 Schiphol - Lisse - Sassenheim

References

External links
NS website 
Dutch Public Transport journey planner 
Arriva website 
Connexxion website 

Railway stations in South Holland
Railway stations opened in 2011
Teylingen
Railway stations in the Netherlands opened in the 21st century